Hakea leucoptera subsp. sericipes  is a small tree with cylinder-shaped leaves and clusters of up to forty-five white fragrant flowers. It is found in northwestern New South Wales, Queensland and Western Australia.

Description
It usually has straight, stiff branches and grey bark. Flowering occurs from November to December.

Taxonomy and naming
Hakea leucoptera was first formally described in 1810 by Robert Brown and the description was published in Transactions of the Linnean Society of London. In 1996 William Baker described two subspecies of H. leucoptera in the Journal of the Adelaide Botanic Garden, including this subspecies and subspecies leucoptera, and the name is accepted by the Australian Plant Census. This subspecies differs from the autonym (subspecies leucoptera) in having shiny hairs pressed against the pedicels. The subspecies epithet (sericipes) is from the Latin words sericeus meaning "silken" and pes meaning "a foot".

Distribution and habitat
Subspecies sericipes is found usually growing in coarse, heavier soils in New South Wales west of the Great Dividing Range and contiguous plains, either as an individual tree or thickets of underbrush shrubs. Also in southern and central Queensland. In dryer areas of central Western Australia.

References

leucoptera
Flora of Western Australia
Flora of Queensland
Flora of New South Wales
Plants described in 1996